Roderick Firth (January 30, 1917 – December 22, 1987) was an American philosopher. He was Professor of Philosophy at Harvard University from 1953 until his death.

Education

Firth earned his Ph.D. in philosophy from Harvard in 1943. His thesis was entitled Sense-Data and the Principle of Reduction.

Career
He taught at Brown University before joining the Harvard faculty in 1953.

Firth is noted for his defense of the ideal observer theory in ethics  and for his exploration of radical empiricism.

See also
Phenomenalism

References

Harvard University faculty
Brown University alumni
1917 births
1987 deaths
Harvard Graduate School of Arts and Sciences alumni
20th-century American philosophers